Central Bucks High School - West, often shortened to CB West, is a public high school housing students in grades ten through twelve. It is located in Doylestown, Pennsylvania and is part of the Central Bucks School District.

During the 2020-2021 school year, CB West had a total enrollment of 1,491. The school's measured FTE for classroom teachers was 98.51 and there was student–teacher ratio of 15.14 to 1. The student population was 52.0% male and 48.0% female. 12.9% of students were economically disadvantaged, 16.9% of students were in special education programs, and 8.0% of students were free-lunch eligible.

The U.S. News & World Report currently ranks CB West as the 34th best high school in Pennsylvania. Lyndell Davis is the school's current principal.

Notable alumni

Lisa Belcastro, politician, Maryland state representative
Weyes Blood, singer
Joe Conti, former Pennsylvania state representative
Fred F. Fielding, former White House Counsel
Scott Green, former National Football League referee
Jon Hensley, actor
Jim Jensen, former professional football player, Miami Dolphins
James A. Michener, author (graduated from Doylestown High School)
Mike Pettine, assistant head coach, Minnesota Vikings
Pink, singer
Mike Senica, ARCA Racing Series and NASCAR driver
Michael Smerconish, radio personality

References

External links

Public high schools in Pennsylvania
Educational institutions established in 1952
Schools in Bucks County, Pennsylvania
1952 establishments in Pennsylvania